Major General Michael David "Mick" Slater,  (born 8 July 1958) is a retired senior officer of the Australian Army, who served as Commander Forces Command from November 2011 until his retirement in January 2015.

Early life
Slater was born in Brisbane, Queensland, on 8 July 1958 to Harold Leslie Slater and Shirly Florence (née Butler). Educated at St Joseph's College, Gregory Terrace, Slater studied surveying at the Queensland University of Technology before joining the Australian Army in 1978, where he graduated from the Officer Cadet School, Portsea.

Army career
Slater has commanded at all levels from platoon to brigade level. He served as a platoon commander in both the 8th/9th Battalion, Royal Australian Regiment and 1st Battalion, Royal Australian Regiment, and later as intelligence officer, company commander and operations officer in 2nd/4th Battalion, Royal Australian Regiment. He was subsequently posted to the School of Infantry. In 1999–2000 he commanded 2nd Battalion, Royal Australian Regiment (2 RAR).

His operational commands have included 2 RAR, and the 3rd Brigade on operations in East Timor, during International Force for East Timor (INTERFET). Slater was awarded the Distinguished Service Cross for his distinguished command and leadership while commander of 2 RAR on Operation Warden, in East Timor. Also he served as an operations staff officer in the United States 3rd Army Headquarters in Kuwait on Operation Pollard.

He has undertaken formal education in mobilisation planning in the United States of America, and is a graduate of the Army Command and Staff College Fort Queenscliff, the Joint Services Command and Staff College, and the U.S. Army War College. Slater holds master's degrees in Strategic Studies and Business Administration.

In January 2011, Slater was appointed to lead the Flood Recovery Taskforce overseeing recovery from the 2010–2011 Queensland floods. This taskforce subsequently transitioned into the Queensland Reconstruction Authority, where Slater remained until 31 August 2011, formally handing over to former Director of the Defence Intelligence Organisation, Major General Richard Wilson. For his efforts in heading the taskforce, along with his stints as Head of the Defence Personnel Executive and Commander 1st Division, Slater was appointed an Officer of the Order of Australia in the 2012 Australia Day Honours List. From 2011 to 2015 Slater served as Commander Forces Command.

Personal
Slater wed Danielle Lisa Morris on 5 February 2000. He has two sons and a daughter from a previous marriage. He appeared on the Chaser's War on Everything because of his honest remarks to a newsreader.

Honours and awards

Notes

References
 

1958 births
Australian generals
Australian military personnel of the International Force for East Timor
Graduates of the Officer Cadet School, Portsea
Living people
Officers of the Order of Australia
People from Brisbane
Queensland University of Technology alumni
Recipients of the Conspicuous Service Cross (Australia)
Recipients of the Distinguished Service Cross (Australia)
United States Army War College alumni
Military personnel from Brisbane
University of Southern Queensland alumni